Life of Christ most commonly refers Life of Jesus in the New Testament.

Life of Christ may also refer to:

Art
Life of Christ in art
Life of Christ (Giotto), a series of paintings attributed to Giotto (1320–1325)
Life of Christ (circle of Cimabue?), a series of paintings speculatively attributed to the circle of Cimabue (1290–1300)

Literature
Vita Christi, the principal work of Ludolph of Saxony, completed in 1374
Life of Christ, a 1874 book by Frederic Farrar
Life of Christ, a book by Henri Didon
Story of Christ (Italian: Storia di Cristo), a 1921 book by Giovanni Papini

See also
Life of Jesus (disambiguation)